Preston Park is an unincorporated community in Wayne County, Pennsylvania, United States. Preston Park has a post office with ZIP code 18455, which opened on December 11, 1890.

References

Unincorporated communities in Wayne County, Pennsylvania
Unincorporated communities in Pennsylvania